Flash Gordon is an American comic strip that ran from January 7, 1934 until it went into reruns following the last new Sunday strip on March 16, 2003.

Flash Gordon Sunday strips
 S001 - "On the Planet Mongo" (1/7/34 to 4/8/34)
 S002 - "Monsters of Mongo" (4/15/34 to 11/18/34)
 S003 - "Tournaments of Mongo" (11/25/34 to 2/24/35)
 S004 - "The Caverns of Mongo" (3/3/35 to 4/14/35)
 S005 - "Witch Queen of Mongo" (4/21/35 to 10/13/35)
 S006 - "At War with Ming" (10/20/35 to 4/5/36)
 S007 - "Undersea Kingdom of Mongo" (4/12/36 to 10/11/36)
 S008 - "Forest Kingdom of Mongo" (10/18/36 to 1/31/37)
 S009 - "Tusk-Men of Mongo" (2/7/37 to 4/18/37)
 S010 - "Beast Men of Mongo" (4/25/37 to 8/8/37)
 S011 - "Outlaws of Mongo" (8/15/37 to 5/29/38)
 S012 - "The Tyrant of Mongo" (6/5/38 to 3/5/39)
 S013 - "Ice Kingdom of Mongo" (3/12/39 to 4/7/40)
 S014 - "Power Men of Mongo" (4/14/40 to 1/12/41)
 S015 - "Fall of Ming" (1/19/41 to 6/29/41)
 S016 - "Return to Earth" (7/6/41 to 12/28/41)
 S017 - "Queen Desira" (1/4/42 to 6/14/42)
 S018 - "Jungles of Mongo" (6/21/42 to 11/1/42)
 S019 - "Fiery Desert of Mongo" (11/8/42 to 7/11/43)
 S020 - "Battle for Tropica" (7/18/43 to 2/6/44)
 S021 - "Triumph in Tropica" (2/13/44 to 8/13/44)
 S022 - "Marvela" (8/20/44 to 2/4/45)
 S023 - "Kang the Cruel" (2/11/45 to 5/20/45)
 S024 - "The Skymen" (5/27/45 to 9/30/45)
 S025 - "The Atomic Age" (10/7/45 to 3/17/46)
 S026 - "The Storm Queen of Valkr" (3/24/46 to 9/29/46)
 S027 - "Wizard King of The Fur Men" (10/6/46 to 1/26/47)
 S028 - "Land Of The Bird Queen" (2/2/47 to 6/1/47)
 S029 - "Man-Hunt" (6/8/47 to 10/12/47)
 S030 - "Dangerous Woman" (10/19/47 to 3/7/48)
 S031 - "Lostland" (3/14/48 to 7/25/48)
 S032 - "The Mystery Moon of Mongo" (8/1/48 to 9/19/48)
 S033 - "On the Doom Comet" (9/26/48 to 6/12/49)
 S034 - "Merma" (6/19/49 to 9/11/49)
 S035 - "Polaria" (9/18/49 to 1/1/50)
 S036 - "Tropix" (1/8/50 to 3/26/50)
 S037 - "Exila" (4/2/50 to 11/5/50)
 S038 - "World Without Metal" (11/12/50 to 3/25/51)
 S039 - "Missiles from the Moon" (4/1/51 to 6/17/51)
 S040 - "Space Platform" (6/24/51 to 10/14/51)
 S041 - "Menta, Queen of Mars" (10/21/51 to 2/24/52)
 S042 - "Rhea, Moon of Saturn" (3/2/52 to 7/6/52)
 S043 - "Pyron, the Comet Master" (7/13/52 to 10/5/52)
 S044 - "Venus" (10/12/52 to 2/22/53)
 S045 - "Moon Pirates" (3/1/53 to 5/31/53)
 S046 - "Titan" (6/7/53 to 9/13/53)
 S047 - "The Mind" (9/20/53 to 1/17/54)
 S048 - "Thanatos" (1/24/54 to 5/2/54)
 S049 - "Bandit of the Asteroids" (5/9/54 to 7/25/54)
 S050 - "The Star Tree" (8/1/54 to 10/17/54)
 S051 - "Child Men and Giants" (10/24/54 to 1/9/55)
 S052 - "The Altered Past" (1/16/55 to 3/27/55)
 S053 - "The Mistiks of Venus" (4/3/55 to 6/19/55)
 S054 - "Centra" (6/26/55 to 8/28/55)
 S055 - "Dark Planet Prison" (9/4/55 to 11/6/55)
 S056 - "Station Crossroads" (11/13/55 to 1/15/56)
 S057 - "Sharks" (1/22/56 to 3/25/56)
 S058 - "The Radioactive Man" (4/1/56 to 6/3/56)
 S059 - "Axe of Mongo" (6/10/56 to 8/19/56)
 S060 - "Journey South" (8/26/56 to 10/28/56)
 S061 - "Paxora" (11/4/56 to 12/30/56)
 S062 - "Rok" (1/6/57 to 3/10/57)
 S063 - "Race to a Star" (3/17/57 to 5/19/57)
 S064 - "The Gatherer" (5/26/57 to 7/14/57)
 S065 - "The Black Box" (7/21/57 to 9/1/57)
 S066 - "Weird World" (9/8/57 to 11/24/57)
 S067 - "The Lonely Crowd" (12/1/57 to 1/12/58)
 S068 - "Missiles from Neptune" (1/19/58 to 3/9/58)
 S069 - "Robinson Crusoe in Space" (3/16/58 to 4/27/58)
 S070 - "The Z-Bomb Cloud" (5/4/58 to 6/15/58)
 S071 - "Stratosphere Beasts" (6/22/58 to 8/17/58)
 S072 - "Rocket Derby" (8/24/58 to 10/12/58)
 S073 - "Moon Wreck" (10/19/58 to 12/14/58)
 S074 - "The Ship of Gold" (12/21/58 to 2/1/59)
 S075 - "The Skorpi" (2/8/59 to 4/5/59)
 S076 - "Flight for Help" (4/12/59 to 6/7/59)
 S077 - "City of Glass" (6/14/59 to 8/23/59)
 S078 - "Venus Mystery" (8/30/59 to 11/1/59)
 S079 - "Robot Spaceship" (11/8/59 to 1/17/60)
 S080 - "The Star Miners" (1/24/60 to 3/27/60)
 S081 - "Deadly Cargo" (4/3/60 to 6/12/60)
 S082 - "The Soil Divers" (6/19/60 to 8/28/60)
 S083 - "Dead Worlds" (9/4/60 to 11/20/60)
 S084 - "Game Warden on Saturn" (11/27/60 to 2/19/61)
 S085 - "The Trail of Orpheus" (2/26/61 to 5/28/61)
 S086 - "Death Farm in Space" (6/4/61 to 9/3/61)
 S087 - "Desert Prince" (9/10/61 to 12/10/61)
 S088 - "Spaceways Patrol" (12/17/61 to 4/1/62)
 S089 - "Living Fossil" (4/8/62 to 7/15/62)
 S090 - "Falling Moon" (7/22/62 to 10/14/62)
 S091 - "Sons of Saturn" (10/21/62 to 1/20/63)
 S092 - "The Force Dome" (1/27/63 to 4/14/63)
 S093 - "Star Beacon" (4/21/63 to 7/14/63)
 S094 - "Yeti" (7/21/63 to 11/17/63)
 S095 - "Boy From Another World" (11/24/63 to 3/15/64)
 S096 - "Dark Sun of Dragor" (3/22/64 to 7/19/64)
 S097 - "The Chameleon" (7/26/64 to 11/8/64)
 S098 - "Man-Made Weather" (11/15/64 to 2/14/65)
 S099 - "Lost Tribe of the Andes" (2/21/65 to 6/13/65)
 S100 - "The Greatest Art Theft" (6/20/65 to 10/10/65)
 S101 - "Con Man in Space" (10/17/65 to 1/30/66)
 S102 - "A Visit From Mercury" (2/6/66 to 6/5/66)
 S103 - "Death World" (6/12/66 to 10/23/66)
 S104 - "The Duke of Naples" (10/30/66 to 4/2/67)
 S105 - "The Moon Launcher" (4/9/67 to 7/16/67)
 S106 - "Captured on Pluto" (7/23/67 to 1/7/68)
 S107 - "The Return of the Chameleon" (1/14/68 to 8/11/68)
 S108 - "Colony on Pluto" (8/18/68 to 12/29/68)
 S109 - "The Robot World" (1/5/69 to 6/8/69)
 S110 - "Invasion!" (6/15/69 to 11/9/69)
 S111 - "Assignment on Pluto" (11/16/69 to 3/29/70)
 S112 - "The Matter Transmitter" (4/5/70 to 7/12/70)
 S113 - "Trouble on Venus" (7/19/70 to 10/25/70)
 S114 - "The Cosmic Tower" (11/1/70 to 2/7/71)
 S115 - "The Death Planet" (2/14/71 to 5/2/71)
 S116 - "Robot War" (5/9/71 to 7/18/71)
 S117 - "The Planet Krogius" (7/25/71 to 10/24/71)
 S118 - "Radiation Giants" (10/31/71 to 12/26/71)
 S119 - "Swamp God of Venus" (1/2/72 to 3/26/72)
 S120 - "The Roamer Asteroid Survivor" (4/2/72 to 6/25/72)
 S121 - "Progress Comes to Venus" (7/2/72 to 9/17/72)
 S122 - "Mercury Station" (9/24/72 to 12/3/72)
 S123 - "Alien Women" (12/10/72 to 3/4/73)
 S124 - "Astro God" (3/11/73 to 5/27/73)
 S125 - "Ric Espada's Son" (6/3/73 to 8/19/73)
 S126 - "Ivo" (8/26/73 to 11/11/73)
 S127 - "Gudrun and the Gambling Satellite" (11/18/73 to 2/3/74) - Same storyline run in daily D2-092
 S128 - "Holograms" (2/10/74 to 4/28/74) - Same storyline run in daily D2-093
 S129 - "Solar Energy Station" (5/5/74 to 7/14/74) - Same storyline run in daily D2-094
 S130 - "Hideout in the 25th Century" (7/21/74 to 9/15/74) - Same storyline run in daily D2-095
 S131 - "Rome" (9/22/74 to 11/10/74) - Same storyline run in daily D2-096
 S132 - "Troy" (11/17/74 to 2/16/75) - Same storyline run in daily D2-097
 S133 - "Kidnapped" (2/23/75 to 6/8/75) 
 S134 - "The Doll Master" (6/15/75 to 9/14/75)
 S135 - "Undina" (9/21/75 to 12/7/75)
 S136 - "Ming!" (12/14/75 to 2/29/76)
 S137 - "Pan Reborn" (3/7/76 to 5/23/76)
 S138 - "Lifeboat" (5/30/76 to 8/15/76)
 S139 - "Martian Ghost Ship" (8/22/76 to 11/7/76)
 S140 - "Monster!" (11/14/76 to 1/30/77)
 S141 - "Planet of Terror" (2/6/77 to 5/8/77)
 S142 - "Geb, the Earth God" (5/15/77 to 8/28/77)
 S143 - "The Slave Runners" (9/4/77 to 12/4/77)
 S144 - "Skorpi Hunters" (12/11/77 to 2/26/78)
 S145 - "The Dark Side of Xalisco!" (3/5/78 to 5/21/78)
 S146 - "Crash Landing" (5/28/78 to 8/13/78)
 S147 - "Dak-Tula's Revenge" (8/20/78 to 11/5/78)
 S148 - "Death Ship" (11/12/78 to 3/11/79)
 S149 - "Skorpi vs Baldur" (3/18/79 to 6/3/79)
 S150 - "Captain Roper" (6/10/79 to 9/9/79)
 S151 - "Power Mad Women" (9/16/79 to 12/30/79)
 S152 - "Hostages" (1/6/80 to 4/6/80)
 S153 - "Noah Two" (4/13/80 to 8/17/80)
 S154 - "Sea Dragons of Venus" (8/24/80 to 12/28/80)
 S155 - "Alien Intruder" (1/4/81 to 4/12/81)
 S156 - "Homestead on Laredo" (4/19/81 to 7/5/81)
 S157 - "Shark Boy of Mongo" (7/12/81 to 11/1/81)
 S158 - "Sargasso of Space" (11/8/81 to 2/21/82)
 S159 - "Dale on Mongo" (2/28/82 to 6/27/82)
 S160 - "Lost Continent of Mongo" (7/4/82 to 10/31/82)
 S161 - "Devil's Outpost" (11/7/82 to 3/13/83)
 S162 - "Expedition to Kkorbu" (3/20/83 to 10/7/84)
 S163 - "The Monster Pit" (10/14/84 to 2/17/85)
 S164 - "Return to Kkorbu" (2/24/85 to 7/7/85)
 S165 - "Son of Vultan" (7/14/85 to 11/3/85)
 S166 - "Horsemen of Madya" (11/10/85 to 2/16/86)
 S167 - "The Annihilator" (2/23/86 to 7/27/86)
 S168 - "The Origin of Prince Barin" (8/3/86 to 12/7/86)
 S169 - "The Hunt" (12/14/86 to 5/3/87)
 S170 - "Dimension of the Living Machines" (5/10/87 to 10/25/87)
 S171 - "Scavengers of Space" (11/1/87 to 3/27/88)
 S172 - "Kkorbu Revisited" (4/3/88 to 3/26/89)
 S173 - "The Cosmic Chess Game" (4/2/89 to 7/2/89)
 S174 - "The Wolfpack" (7/9/89 to 10/29/89)
 S175 - "Death on Kkorbu" (11/5/89 to 5/6/90)
 S176 - "The Mind" (5/13/90 to 7/15/90)
 S177R - "Homestead on Laredo" (7/22/90 to 10/7/90) - reprint of S156
 S178 - "Princess Simila" (10/14/90 to 8/11/91)
 S179 - "The Purple Death" (8/18/91 to 4/12/92)
 S180 - "Utopia" (4/19/92 to 8/30/92)
 S181 - "The Journey" (9/6/92 to 12/27/92)
 S182 - "Rygalia" (1/3/93 to 5/9/93)
 S183 - "God Machine" (5/16/93 to 9/12/93)
 S184 - "Under the Sea" (9/19/93 to 1/2/94)
 S185 - "A Matter of Honor" (1/9/94 to 5/1/94)
 S186 - "Triangle in Eden" (5/8/94 to 9/4/94)
 S187 - "Edge of Doom" (9/11/94 to 6/18/95)
 S188 - "Ming's Circus" (6/25/95 to 1/14/96)
 S189 - "Demon From the Dark Dimension" (1/21/96 to 4/21/96)
 S190 - "Nightfall on Mongo" (4/28/96 to 8/25/96)
 S191 - "The Way it Began" (9/1/96 to 9/29/96)
 S192 - "The Return of Ming" (10/6/96 to 12/22/96)
 S193 - "Durok's Revenge" (12/29/96 to 5/11/97)
 S194 - "Lair of the Damned" (5/18/97 to 7/13/97)
 S195 - "Wartog" (7/20/97 to 10/12/97)
 S196 - "Alania Under Siege" (10/19/97 to 5/3/98)
 S197 - "Traitor in Our Midst" (5/10/98 to 10/18/98)
 S198 - "The Way it Began (Re-Edit)" (10/25/98 to 11/1/98) - partial reprint and re-edit of S191
 S199 - "Shadowland" (11/8/98 to 1/3/99)
 S200 - "Return To Syk" (1/10/99 to 3/28/99)
 S201 - "Back to Earth" (4/4/99 to 10/31/99)
 S202 - "Garden of Evil" (11/7/99 to 12/19/99)
 S203 - "Artist Gallery" (12/26/99 to 12/26/99)
 S204R - "The Way it Began (Re-Edit)" (1/2/00 to 1/9/00) - reprint of S198
 S205 - "To Melt a Queen's Heart" (1/16/00 to 6/18/00)
 S206 - "Operation: Escape" (6/25/00 to 8/6/00)
 S207 - "Peace Offering" (8/13/00 to 11/5/00)
 S208 - "Secret Agent X-9" (11/12/00 to 6/17/01)
 S209 - "Nesting Ground" (6/24/01 to 8/12/01)
 S210 - "Flashback" (8/19/01 to 10/28/01) - partial reprint of S191 with new art
 S211 - "Slithers" (11/4/01 to 5/12/02)
 S212 - "Crowning Glory" (5/19/02 to 8/18/02)
 S213 - "Hatchlings" (8/25/02 to 9/22/02)
 S214 - "Tournament of Death" (9/29/02 to 3/16/03)
 S215R - "The Way it Began (Re-Edit)" (3/23/03 to 3/30/03) - reprint of S198
 S216R - "Wartog" (4/6/03 to 6/29/03) - reprint of S194
 S217R - "Demon From the Dark Dimension " (7/6/03 to 9/28/03) - partial reprint of S189
 S218R - "Traitor in Our Midst" (10/5/03 to 3/14/04) - reprint of S197
 S219R - "The Way it Began (Re-Edit)" (3/21/04 to 3/28/04) - reprint of S198
 S220R - "Return to Syk" (4/4/04 to 6/20/04) - reprint of S200
 S221R - "Back to Earth" (6/27/04 to 1/23/05) - reprint of S201
 S222R - "Garden of Evil" (1/30/05 to 3/13/05) - reprint of S202
 S223R - "The Way it Began (Re-Edit)" (3/20/05 to 3/27/05) - reprint of S198
 S224R - "To Melt a Queen's Heart" (4/3/05 to 9/4/05) - reprint of S205
 S225R - "Operation: Escape" (9/11/05 to 10/23/05) - reprint of S206
 S226R - "Peace Offering" (10/30/05 to 1/22/06) - reprint of S207
 S227R - "Secret Agent X-9" (1/29/06 to 9/3/06) - reprint of S208
 S228R - "Nesting Ground" (9/10/06 to 10/29/06) - reprint of S209
 S229R - "Flashback" (11/5/06 to 1/14/07) - reprint of S210
 S230R - "Slithers" (1/21/07 to 7/29/07) - reprint of S211
 S231R - "Crowning Glory" (8/5/07 to 11/4/07) - reprint of S212
 S232R - "Hatchlings" (11/11/07 to 12/9/07) - reprint of S213
 S233R - "Tournament of Death" (12/16/07 to 6/1/08) - reprint of S214
 S234R - "Demon From the Dark Dimension" (6-8-08 to 8-31-08) - partial reprint of S189 (missing 1/21/96 strip)
 S235R - "Nightfall on Mongo" (9/7/08 to 1/4/09) - reprint of S190
 S236R - "The Way It Began" (1/11/09 to 2/8/09) - reprint of S191
 S237R - "The Return of Ming" (2/15/09 to 5/3/09) - reprint of S192
 S238R - "Durok's Revenge" (5/10/09 to 9/20/09) - reprint of S193
 S239R - "Lair of the Damned" (9/27/09 to 11/22/09) - reprint of S194
 S240R - "Wartog" (11/29/09 to 2/21/10) - reprint of S195
 S241R - "Alania Under Siege" (2/28/10 to 9/12/10) - reprint of S196
 S242R - "Traitor in Our Midst" (9/19/2010 to 2/27/11) - reprint of S197
 S243R - "The Way it Began (Re-Edit)" (3/6/11 to 3/13/11) - reprint of S198
 S244R - "Shadowland" (3/20/11 to 5/15/11) - reprint of S199
 S245R - "Return To Syk" (5/22/11 to 8/7/11)- reprint of S200
 S246R - "Back to Earth" (8/14/2011 - 3/11/2012) - reprint of S201
 S247R - "Garden of Evil" (3/18/2012 - 4/29/2012) - reprint of S202
 S248R - "To Melt a Queen's Heart" (5/6/2012 - 10/7/2012) - reprint of S205
 S249R - "Operation Escape" (10/14/2012 - 11/25/2012) - reprint of S206
 S250R - "Peace Offering" (12/2/2012 - 2/24/2013) - reprint of S207
 S251R - "Secret Agent X-9" (3/3/2013 - 10/6/2013) - reprint of S208
 S252R - "Nesting Ground" (10/13/2013 - 12/1/2013) - reprint of S209
 S253R - "Flashback" (12/8/2013 to 2/16/2014) - reprint of S210
 S254R - "Slithers" (2/23/14 to 8/31/14) - reprint of S211
 S255R - "Crowning Glory" (9/7/14 to 12/7/14) - reprint of S212
 S256R - "Hatchlings" (12/14/14 to 1/11/15) - reprint of S213
 S257R - "Tournament of Death" (1/18/15 to 7/5/15) - reprint of S214

Note - The Flash Gordon Sunday strip is currently still running reprints of Jim Keefe stories.  The last completely new strip was published on 3/16/03. The 12/4/11 Sunday strip (which was a reprint of the 7/25/99 strip) had the image of President Clinton from the original strip replaced with a new one of President Obama.

Flash Gordon daily comic strip story guide

 Series 1
 D1-001 - "Princess Lita" (5/27/40 to 2/22/41) 
 D1-002 - "Freeland" (2/24/41 to 8/21/41) 
 D1-003 - "War on Earth" (8/22/41 to 12/13/41) 
 D1-004 - "Disaster in Space" (12/15/41 to 1/17/42) 
 D1-005 - "Shipwrecked" (1/19/42 to 4/25/42) 
 D1-006 - "Radium Mines of Electra" (4/27/42 to 7/11/42) 
 D1-007 - "Queen Tigra of Forestia" (7/13/42 to 11/26/42) 
 D1-008 - "Royal Hunt" (11/27/42 to 4/21/43) 
 D1-009 - "Isle of the Elvins" (4/22/43 to 3/25/44) 
 D1-010 - "The Menace of Mysta" (3/27/44 to 4/25/44) 
 D1-011 - "Home" (4/26/44 to 6/3/44) 
 Series 2
 D2-001 - "Space Prison" (11/19/51 to 2/16/52) 
 D2-002 - "The City of Ice" (2/18/52 to 6/14/52) 
 D2-003 - "The Butterfly Men" (6/16/52 to 8/9/52) 
 D2-004 - "Tartarus" (8/11/52 to 10/18/52) 
 D2-005 - "The Awful Forest” (10/20/52 to 12/30/52) 
 D2-006 - "Mr. Murlin” (12/31/52 to 4/20/53) 
 D2-007 - "The Space Kids on Zoran” (4/21/53 to 10/24/53) 
 D2-008 - "The Lost Continent” (10/26/53 to 3/20/54) 
 D2-009 - "Circea” (3/22/54 to 5/29/54) 
 D2-010 - "The Deadly Touch” (5/31/54 to 8/30/54) 
 D2-011 - "Peril Park” (8/31/54 to 11/13/54) 
 D2-012 - "The Martian Baby” (11/15/54 to 2/5/55) 
 D2-013 - "The Trail of the Vulke” (2/7/55 to 4/26/55) 
 D2-014 - "Tympani” (4/27/55 to 7/9/55) 
 D2-015 - "Starling” (7/11/55 to 9/3/55) 
 D2-016 - "Space Circus” (9/5/55 to 10/29/55) 
 D2-017 - "The Swamp-Girl” (10/31/55 to 12/31/55) 
 D2-018 - "Return to Mongo” (1/2/56 to 3/24/56) 
 D2-019 - "Kag the Conqueror” (3/26/56 to 6/9/56) 
 D2-020 - "Kozy and Skurvy's E-Z Island" (6/11/56 to 9/29/56) 
 D2-021 - "Robb and Bey's Wonders of Mongo” (10/1/56 to 12/25/56) 
 D2-022 - "Mezmo” (12/26/56 to 2/23/57) 
 D2-023 - "Dust Devil” (2/25/57 to 4/20/57) 
 D2-024 - "City of Azcar Women” (4/22/57 to 6/29/57) 
 D2-025 - "River Pirates” (7/1/57 to 8/17/57) 
 D2-026 - "Cybernia” (8/19/57 to 10/19/57) 
 D2-027 - "Radioactive Loot” (10/21/57 to 12/7/57) 
 D2-028 - "The Time Pendulum” (12/9/57 to 1/25/58) 
 D2-029 - "The Far Side of the Moon” (1/27/58 to 3/15/58) 
 D2-030 - "Behind the Flying Saucers" (3/17/58 to 5/3/58) 
 D2-031 - "Movie-Making on Pluto" (5/5/58 to 6/21/58) 
 D2-032 - "Solar Mirror" (6/23/58 to 7/26/58) 
 D2-033 - "Colony on Mars” (7/28/58 to 9/13/58) 
 D2-034 - "Disaster at Bigtree” (9/15/58 to 11/8/58) 
 D2-035 - "Derelict of the Skorpi War” (11/10/58 to 12/27/58) 
 D2-036 - "Runaway Weather Satellite" (12/29/58 to 2/14/59)  
 D2-037 - "Lost Legion” (2/16/59 to 5/2/59) 
 D2-038 - "The Matter Transmitter” (5/4/59 to 6/27/59) 
 D2-039 - "Flash Without Dale” (6/29/59 to 9/5/59) 
 D2-040 - "Space Construction Corps” (9/7/59 to 10/24/59) 
 D2-041 - "H-Bomb Under the Mongo Sea” (10/26/59 to 1/5/60) 
 D2-042 - "The Metallic Raiders” (1/6/60 to 3/5/60) 
 D2-043 - "The Airborne Ark” (3/7/60 to 4/23/60) 
 D2-044 - "The First Man on Mars” (4/25/60 to 6/25/60) 
 D2-045 - "Quarantine Station” (6/27/60 to 9/3/60) 
 D2-046 - "The Psi People” (9/5/60 to 12/9/60) 
 D2-047 - "Deathfighters” (12/10/60 to 3/11/61) 
 D2-048 - "Waldo Without Spacesuit” (3/13/61 to 5/27/61) 
 D2-049 - "The Ambassadors” (5/29/61 to 7/8/61) 
 D2-050 - "Titanic II” (7/10/61 to 10/7/61) 
 D2-051 - "Horseparlor in the Sky” (10/9/61 to 12/23/61) 
 D2-052 - "Robot Worker” (12/25/61 to 3/17/62) 
 D2-053 - "Back in Time” (3/19/62 to 5/5/62) 
 D2-054 - "Dolphins of Venus” (5/7/62 to 7/28/62) 
 D2-055 - "Dimension X” (7/30/62 to 9/15/62) 
 D2-056 - "Space Scouts and Skorpi” (9/17/62 to 3/2/63) 
 D2-057 - "Death-Stone” (3/4/63 to 5/25/63) 
 D2-058 - "The Hapless Alien” (5/27/63 to 11/9/63) 
 D2-059 - "Martian Treasure” (11/11/63 to 2/22/64) 
 D2-060 - "Solid-Gold Bomb” (2/24/64 to 6/13/64) 
 D2-061 - "Space Race” (6/15/64 to 10/10/64) 
 D2-062 - "Shipbuilding on Mars” (10/12/64 to 1/16/65) 
 D2-063 - "The Robot War” (1/18/65 to 4/28/65) 
 D2-064 - "The Maybe Machine” (4/29/65 to 8/21/65) 
 D2-065 - "Space-Sweep” (8/23/65 to 12/18/65) 
 D2-066 - "The Asteroid Miners” (12/20/65 to 4/7/66) 
 D2-067 - "Ming IV” (4/8/66 to 9/27/66) 
 D2-068 - "Food Ship” (9/28/66 to 2/11/67) 
 D2-069 - "Radioactive Seas” (2/13/67 to 7/12/67) 
 D2-070 - "Survival Test” (7/13/67 to 1/13/68) 
 D2-071 - "Egon Blant Escapes” (1/15/68 to 5/18/68) 
 D2-072 - "Living Statues” (5/20/68 to 10/5/68) 
 D2-073 - "Flash Gordon and the Vikings” (10/7/68 to 2/21/69) 
 D2-074 - "McFry's Vendetta” (2/22/69 to 8/9/69) 
 D2-075 - "Manhunt” (8/11/69 to 11/8/69) 
 D2-076 - "Flash Gordon vs. the Puppet Master" (11/10/69 to 2/28/70) 
 D2-077 - "Tournaments of Free Mongo” (3/2/70 to 6/17/70) 
 D2-078 - "Desert Tribes of Mongo” (6/18/70 to 9/5/70) 
 D2-079 - "Pirates of Mongo” (9/7/70 to 1/16/71) 
 D2-080 - "Dinosaur Valley of Mongo” (1/18/71 to 4/24/71) 
 D2-081 - "Neptunia and Frigia" (4/26/71 to 9/4/71) 
 D2-082 - "An Alien Stowaway” (9/6/71 to 11/20/71) 
 D2-083 - "Convict Squad on Rog” (11/22/71 to 2/5/72) 
 D2-084 - "Convict Squad and the Skraggs” (2/7/72 to 4/1/72) 
 D2-085 - "Convict Squad and the Drug Trade” (4/3/72 to 5/20/72) 
 D2-086 - "Operation Medusa” (5/22/72 to 7/29/72) 
 D2-087 - "Kenoma and the Space-Jacker” (7/31/72 to 10/28/72) 
 D2-088 - "Willy and the Martians” (10/30/72 to 1/13/73) 
 D2-089 - "Jack Hammer” (1/15/73 to 4/7/73) 
 D2-090 - "Dale's Mission" (4/9/73 to 7/14/73) 
 D2-091 - "Twice in Time” (7/16/73 to 11/24/73) 
 D2-092 - "Gudrun and the Gambling Satellite” (11/26/73 to 2/8/74) - Same storyline run in Sunday S127
 D2-093 - "Holograms” (2/10/74 to 4/30/74) - Same storyline run in Sunday S128
 D2-094 - "Solar Energy Station” (5/1/74 to 7/13/74) - Same storyline run in Sunday S129
 D2-095 - "Hideout in the 25th Century” (7/15/74 to 9/18/74) - Same storyline run in Sunday S130
 D2-096 - "Rome” (9/19/74 to 11/16/74) - Same storyline run in Sunday S131
 D2-097 - "Troy” (11/18/74 to 2/19/75) - Same storyline run in Sunday S132
 D2-098 - "The Making of a Legend” (2/20/75 to 9/6/75) 
 D2-099 - "Nomads of Mongo" (9/8/75 to 11/29/75) 
 D2-100 - "Amazons of Mongo” (12/1/75 to 2/21/76) 
 D2-101 - "Kozy & Skurvey and the Desert Raiders” (2/23/76 to 5/15/76) 
 D2-102 - "War Robots” (5/17/76 to 8/7/76) 
 D2-103 - "Rebels on Venus” (8/9/76 to 10/30/76) 
 D2-104 - "North Star Invaders” (11/1/76 to 1/22/77) 
 D2-105 - "Planet of the Klet” (1/24/77 to 5/7/77) 
 D2-106 - "Atlantis” (5/9/77 to 9/1/77) 
 D2-107 - "Space School” (9/2/77 to 12/17/77) 
 D2-108 - "Skorpi on Mongo” (12/19/77 to 2/18/78) 
 D2-109 - "Ming Supreme” (2/20/78 to 6/10/78) 
 D2-110 - "Death” (6/12/78 to 8/12/78) 
 D2-111 - "Slaves” (8/14/78 to 11/18/78) 
 D2-112 - "Odyssey” (11/20/78 to 2/24/79) 
 D2-113 - "Ming's Women” (2/26/79 to 6/16/79) 
 D2-114 - "Black Out" (6/18/79 to 8/18/79) 
 D2-115 - "Ming's Children” (8/20/79 to 12/22/79) 
 D2-116 - "Shark Boy” (12/24/79 to 4/14/80) 
 D2-117 - "The Biggest Living Thing in the Universe” (4/15/80 to 8/9/80) 
 D2-118 - "Mind Trip” (8/11/80 to 10/18/80) 
 D2-119 - "Skorpi in Atlantis” (10/20/80 to 1/21/81) 
 D2-120 - "Prince Alan” (1/22/81 to 11/14/81) 
 D2-121 - "Captain Jodeen” (11/16/81 to 2/20/82) 
 D2-122 - "Knight of Mongo” (2/22/82 to 6/26/82) 
 D2-123 - "The Lure of the Xerees” (6/28/82 to 9/18/82) 
 D2-124 - "The Living Death of Ming the Merciless” (9/20/82 to 1/22/83) 
 D2-125 - "The Witch Queen's Magic” (1/24/83 to 5/7/83) 
 D2-126 - "The Treasure Hunt" (5/9/83 to 12/6/83) 
 D2-127 - "Rebellion in Frigia" (12/7/83 to 5/26/84) 
 D2-128 - "EMP” (5/28/84 to 9/29/84) 
 D2-129 - "Return to Atlantis” (10/1/84 to 1/26/85) 
 D2-130 - "The Mystic Isles of Mongo” (1/28/85 to 8/17/85) 
 D2-131 - "Gorilla Men of Mongo" (8/19/85 to 10/12/85) 
 D2-132 - "The Dark Seed” (10/14/85 to 2/22/86) 
 D2-133 - "Baldur Battles Skorpi" (2/24/86 to 5/10/86) 
 D2-134 - "The Bear” (5/12/86 to 8/21/86) 
 D2-135 - "The Origin of Flash Gordon” (8/22/86 to 6/6/87) 
 D2-136 - "The Cave World of Mongo” (Origin Part 2) (6/8/87 to 8/15/87) 
 D2-137 - "The Ice Kingdom of Mongo” (Origin Part 3) (8/17/87 to 12/26/87) 
 D2-138 - "The Water World of Mongo” (Origin Part 4) (12/28/87 to 5/14/88) 
 D2-139 - "Forest Primeval” (Origin Part 5) (5/16/88 to 10/1/88) 
 D2-140 - "Egon on Mongo" (10/3/88 to 3/11/89) 
 D2-141 - "Dinosaurs!” (3/13/89 to 5/26/89) 
 D2-142 - "Hari Hari” (5/27/89 to 8/22/89) 
 D2-143 - "The High Ground” (8/23/89 to 12/14/89) 
 D2-144 - "Mission to Mongo” (12/15/89 to 2/10/90) 
 D2-145 - "In Search of Ming” (2/12/90 to 7/14/90) 
 D2-146R - "Skorpi in Atlantis”(7/16/90 to 10/6/90) - partial reprint of D2-119
 D2-147 - "Tournament of Frigia" (10/8/90 to 1/5/91) 
 D2-148 - "Roughing It" (1/7/91 to 8/10/91) 
 D2-149 - "Bring Me the Head of Flash Gordon" (8/12/91 to 11/23/91) 
 D2-150 - "The Big Jump" (11/25/91 to 4/4/92) 
 D2-151 - "Return to Fear” (4/6/92 to 10/3/92) 
 D2-152 - "The Bean Men of Mumbo" (10/5/92 to 7/3/93)

Sources
This information was compiled by consulting all of the strips published in newspapers between 1934 and 2007. The 2008–11 information on Jim Keefe's Sunday strips is from Keefe Studios.

References

Flash Gordon
Lists of comic strips